The Mawbey Baronetcy, of Botleys in the County of Surrey, was a title in the Baronetage of Great Britain. It was created on 30 July 1765 for Joseph Mawbey, Member of Parliament for Southwark and Surrey. The title became extinct on the death of the second Baronet in 1817.

Mawbey baronets, of Botleys (1765)
Sir Joseph Mawbey, 1st Baronet (1730–1798)
Sir Joseph Mawbey, 2nd Baronet (–1817), was married in 1796 to Charlotte Caroline Maria, daughter of Thomas Henchman of Littleton, but died without male issue. The estate of Botleys was sold shortly afterwards. His widow died in 1832.

References

Extinct baronetcies in the Baronetage of Great Britain